Billingford or Pirleston is a village and former civil parish,  south of Norwich, now in the parish of Scole, in the South Norfolk district, in the county of Norfolk, England. In 1931 the parish had a population of 150.

Features 
Billingford has a church called St Leonard and a pub called The Horseshoes on Lower Street, adjacent to Billingford Windmill.

History 
The name "Billingford" possibly means 'ford at the place called Billing' or 'ford of the Billingas'. Billingford was recorded in the Domesday Book as P(re)lestuna. On 1 April 1935 the parish was abolished and merged with Scole.

War Memorial
Billingford's War Memorial is located within St. Leonard's Church and takes the form of a marble plaque. It bears the following names for the First World War:
 Captain Gordon M. Flowerdew VC (1887-1918), Lord Strathcona's Horse, Canadian Army
 Steward First Class Arthur Nunn (1894-1916), HMS Conquest
 Bombardier Walter Race (1884-1917), 94th Battery, Royal Field Artillery
 Corporal Herbert Race (1894-1917), 9th Battalion, Royal Norfolk Regiment
 Lance-Corporal Charles W. Thrower (d.1918), 15th Battalion, Suffolk Regiment
 Private George F. Punt (d.1918), 7th Battalion, Duke of Cornwall's Light Infantry
 Private Allan Fox MM (d.1918), 1st Battalion, Royal Norfolk Regiment
 Private John L. Whiting (d.1917), 2nd Battalion, Royal Norfolk Regiment

And, the following for the Second World War:
 Corporal Stanley W. A. Hill (1915-1944), No. 653 (Aerial Observation) Squadron, RAF

References

External links

Villages in Norfolk
Former civil parishes in Norfolk
South Norfolk